Princess Henriëtte of Nassau-Weilburg, then of Nassau (22 April 1780, in Kirchheimbolanden – 2 January 1857, in Kirchheim unter Teck) was a German duchess. She was a daughter of Prince Charles Christian and Carolina of Orange-Nassau, daughter of William IV, Prince of Orange.

Marriage and children
On 28 January 1797, she married Duke Louis of Württemberg, a son of Duke Friedrich II Eugen, Duke of Württemberg, at the Hermitage, near Bayreuth.

They had five children:

 Maria Dorothea (1797–1855); married in 1819 Archduke Joseph, Palatine of Hungary (1776–1847).
 Amelie Theresa (28 June 1799 – 28 November 1848); married in 1817 Joseph, Duke of Saxe-Altenburg (1789–1868).
 Pauline Therese (1800–1873), married in 1820 her first cousin William I of Wurttemberg.
 Elisabeth Alexandrine (1802–1864); married in 1830 Prince Wilhelm of Baden (1792–1859).
 Alexander (9 September 1804 – 4 July 1885); founded a cadet branch of the House of Württemberg, known as the Dukes of Teck.

Ancestry

House of Nassau-Weilburg
1780 births
1857 deaths
People from Kirchheimbolanden
Duchesses of Württemberg
Princesses of Nassau-Weilburg
Daughters of monarchs